The 1960–61 season is the 81st season of competitive football by Rangers.

Overview
Rangers played a total of 65 competitive matches during the 1960–61 season.

Results
All results are written with Rangers' score first.

Scottish First Division

Scottish Cup

League Cup

European Cup Winners' Cup

Appearances

See also
 1960–61 in Scottish football
 1960–61 Scottish Cup
 1960–61 Scottish League Cup
 1960–61 European Cup Winners' Cup

References 

Scottish football championship-winning seasons
Rangers F.C. seasons
Rangers